Óscar Carrasco (26 November 1927 – 31 August 1998) was a Chilean footballer. He played in six matches for the Chile national football team from 1953 to 1957. He was also part of Chile's squad for the 1953 South American Championship.

References

External links
 

1927 births
1998 deaths
Chilean footballers
Chile international footballers
Association football midfielders
Place of birth missing
Audax Italiano footballers